Michael Podro  (13 March 1931 – 28 March 2008) was a British art historian. Podro, the son of Jewish refugees from central Europe, was born in and grew up in Hendon, Middlesex. He attended Berkhamsted school in Hertfordshire, served in the RAF, and read English at Jesus College, Cambridge and philosophy at University College London. After finishing his PhD in philosophy and art history, he taught at Camberwell College of Arts, the Warburg Institute and Essex University, where he became professor. His best known work are from his period here: The Manifold in Perception: Theories of Art from Kant to Hildebrand (1972), and Critical Historians of Art (1982). Here Podro argued for bringing philosophical questions to bear on the study of art, as well as the prevailing focus on style, attribution and contextual detail.

Podro served as a trustee at the Victoria and Albert Museum, and was a fellow of the British Academy. In 1961 he married Charlotte Booth, with whom he had two daughters.

References

External source

1931 births
2008 deaths
Military personnel from Middlesex
20th-century Royal Air Force personnel
Royal Air Force airmen
English Jews
Alumni of Jesus College, Cambridge
Alumni of University College London
English art historians
Academics of the Warburg Institute
Academics of the University of Essex
Fellows of the British Academy
Commanders of the Order of the British Empire
People educated at Berkhamsted School
People from Hendon